Park & Arbourthorne ward—which includes the districts of Arbourthorne, Gleadless, and Norfolk Park—is one of the 28 electoral wards in City of Sheffield, England. The population of this ward in 2001 was 17,500 people in 7,800 households. The ward population at the 2011 Census was 19,133. It is one of the five wards that form the Sheffield Heeley parliamentary constituency.

Arbourthorne is part of the city of Sheffield, England. It lies in the S2 postcode and is the home of Hope Family Arbourthorne Church, Sheffield Springs Academy, Norfolk and Arbourthorne Primary Schools.

Much of the area is council housing although some is now private sector.

Gleadless

Gleadless is a former village, since 1967 a suburb of Sheffield located in the southeastern portion of the city. The name comes from the Old English Glida Leah meaning a kite clearing in a wood.

Gleadless is served by the Purple and Blue Sheffield Supertram lines at Gleadless Townend tram stop on Ridgeway Road.

Norfolk Park
Norfolk Park is a residential area of Sheffield that surrounds Norfolk Heritage Park close to the city centre. The area has been undergoing regeneration over the last few years with the demolition of the former high rise flats in favour of low rise housing with mixed private and local housing association ownership. A privately operated student village is located in the area next to the park.

Norfolk Park is on the blue and purple tram lines with three stops, Park Grange Croft, Park Grange Road and Arbourthorne Road.

References 

()

External links
 Sources for the History of Arbourthorne Produced by Sheffield City Council's Libraries and Archives

Wards of Sheffield